Mansur Kandi (also Romanized as Manşūr Kandī) is a village in Mokriyan-e Shomali Rural District, in the Central District of Miandoab County, West Azerbaijan Province, Iran. At the 2006 census, its population was 246, in 69 families.

References 

Populated places in Miandoab County